Blueberry Yum Yum may refer to:

 "Blueberry Yum Yum", a song by Ludacris from the 2004 album The Red Light District
 A specific variety of marijuana